Ernst Burgbacher (born 28 May 1949 in Trossingen) is a German politician and member of the FDP.

External links 
  
 Biography by German Bundestag

1949 births
Living people
German Protestants
People from Tuttlingen (district)
University of Tübingen alumni
University of Freiburg alumni
Members of the Bundestag for Baden-Württemberg
Members of the Bundestag 2009–2013
Members of the Bundestag 2005–2009
Members of the Bundestag 2002–2005
Members of the Bundestag 1998–2002
Members of the Bundestag for the Free Democratic Party (Germany)